Sadabad is a town and a nagar panchayat in Hathras district in the Indian state of Uttar Pradesh.

Geography
It has an average elevation of 175 metres (574 feet).

History
Sadabad was the part of Mathura District till 1997.It is a Jaat and Brahmin dominated area. It has an ancient fort known as "Kothi Ganj" and also a river known as "Karban river". Sadabad is located between 4 major cities of Uttar Pradesh: Agra, Mathura, Aligarh and Etah.

It is situated on a major connective road, NH 93, which links Agra to Aligarh via Sadabad, Hathras and Aligarh. It is well connected to Mathura and Raya. Some of its Village panchanyat are Bisawar, Kursanda, Vedai, Jaitai, Arotha, Tasinga, Dagsah, Mansya, Koopa etc

Nawabs of Sadabad

The Nawabs of Sadabad, belonging to Lalkhani - Muslim Rajput, once were jagirdars of Sadabad. A few notable names are as below:-

Kunwar Mohammad Ashraf Ali Khan, Member of Uttar Pradesh Legislative Assembly in 1952
 Kunwar Mustemand Ali Khan, Member of Uttar Pradesh Legislative Assembly in 1985,1989
Kunwar Javed Ali Khan, Ex. Minister, U.P.

Demographics
As of the 2001 Census of India, Sadabad had a population of 31,737. Males constitute 53% of the population and females 47%. Sadabad has an average literacy rate of 53%, lower than the national average of 59.5%: male literacy is 61%, and female literacy is 43%. In Sadabad, 18% of the population is under 6 years of age. It is approximately 35 km from Agra, The city of Taj Mahal, on National highway 93. Being a semiurban area, economy is based mainly on potato farming.

Caste communities
Brahmins, Jaat, Kori, Other Backward Caste, Vaishya, Sunaar. Gautam Brahmins are in majority in Sadabad town.

References

Cities and towns in Hathras district
Former zamindari estates in Uttar Pradesh